Placerville Airport  is three miles east of Placerville, in El Dorado County, California, United States. The National Plan of Integrated Airport Systems for 2011–2015 categorized it as a general aviation airport.

There are no passenger airlines at the airport. The runway is long enough for aircraft such as the Pilatus PC-12 and is home to a T-28 Trojan. In 1977-78 California Air Commuter scheduled Piper Navajos to Placerville.

Facilities
Placerville Airport covers 243 acres (98 ha) at an elevation of 2,585 feet (788 m). Its one runway, 5/23, is 4,201 by 75 feet (1,280 x 23 m). It has one helipad, H1, 50 by 50 feet (15 x 15 m).

In the year ending April 30, 2010 the airport had 66,000 aircraft operations, average 180 per day: 97% general aviation, 1.5% air taxi, and 1.5% military. 138 aircraft were then based at the airport: 96% single-engine, 2% multi-engine, 1% helicopter, and 1% ultralight.

References

External links 
 El Dorado County airports
 Aerial image as of May 1993 from USGS The National Map
 

Airports in El Dorado County, California
Placerville, California